The Jempol District is the largest district in the Malaysian state of Negeri Sembilan. The district borders Jelebu District to the northwest, Kuala Pilah District to the west, Tampin District to the south, Bera District, Pahang to the northeast and Segamat District, Johor to the east. Bandar Seri Jempol and Bahau are the principal towns in Jempol.

Jempol is also the meeting point of Muar and Serting rivers. The meeting point had played an important transportation role in ancient times. Known historically as Jalan Penarikan, it connected trade posts west of the Malay Peninsula with population centres in the east coast and vice versa.

Hospital 
Jempol is equipped with a hospital funded by the Malaysian Ministry of Health. The hospital is the main health care provider in Jempol and its surrounding areas including Serting and Bahau. Residents of Rompin and other nearby areas in Pahang that used to seek treatment in Kuala Pilah have started to visit the hospital. Bahau is 21 km away from Kuala Pilah.

Administrative divisions

Jempol District is divided into 5 mukims, which are:
 Jelai
 Kuala Jempol
 Rompin
 Serting Ilir (Capital)
 Serting Ulu

Government and politics 
Jempol Municipal Council, formerly known as the Jempol District Council from 1 August 1980 until 29 January 2019, is the local authority of Jempol District.

Demographics

Transportation

Car
Federal Route 10 is the main route serving Jempol constituency, passing through downtown Bahau and touching Bandar Seri Jempol before continuing to Temerloh, Pahang.

Bera Highway Federal Route 11 cuts through Jempol constituency in an east-west direction, beginning in Serting and ending near Bandar Tun Abdul Razak in southern Pahang.

Federal Route 13 links Bahau to Juasseh in Kuala Pilah constituency.

Public transportation
Bahau KTM is the principal railway station serving this constituency.

Notable natives
 Fish Leong, singer

Federal Parliament and State Assembly Seats

List of Jempol district representatives in the Federal Parliament (Dewan Rakyat) 

List of Jempol district representatives in the State Legislative Assembly (Dewan Undangan Negeri)

See also

 Districts of Malaysia

References